The I Am a Lot Like You! Tour was an international concert tour by American singer St. Vincent, which supported her fifth studio album Masseduction (2017). The tour started on April 5, 2018, in Mexico City, Mexico and concluded on April 7, 2019, in Bogotá, Colombia.

Background 
The I Am a Lot A Like You Tour was a follow-up of the previous Fear the Future Tour, promoting the Masseduction album across the world, but a departure from the one-woman show presented in the last run, since this time there was a live backing band accompanying Clark.

The tour comprised mostly summer festivals, but also included some solo concerts and three rescheduled dates from the previous tour.

Set list 
This set list is from the April 5, 2019 concert at Lollapalooza in São Paulo, Brazil. It is not intended to represent all concerts for the tour.

 "Sugarboy"
 "Los Ageless"
 "Pills"
 "Savior"
 "Masseduction"
 "Marrow"
 "Cheerleader"
 "Digital Witness"
 "Rattlesnake"
 "Birth in Reverse"
 "Fast Slow Disco"
 "Fear the Future"
 "New York"

Tour dates

Notes

References 

2018 concert tours
2019 concert tours
St. Vincent (musician) concert tours